Booger or boogers may refer to:

 Dried nasal mucus (U.S. colloquial)

People 
 Booger McFarland (born 1977), American football player
 Marco Boogers (born 1967), Dutch footballer
 Quincy Boogers (born 1995), Dutch footballer
 Johann Lucas Boër (1751–1835), German physician born Johann Lucas Boogers
 Mike Shaw (1957–2010), American professional wrestler known by his ring name "Bastion Booger"
 Ed Smith (streetball player), American streetball player nicknamed "Booger"

Fictional characters 
 Dudley "Booger" Dawson, in the Revenge of the Nerds film series
 Booger, in the Mixels television series

See also 
 Bogeyman, a mythical creature, ghost or hobgoblin; also boogerman, or boogieman
 Boogertown, North Carolina, U.S.
 Snot (disambiguation), another word for booger

Lists of people by nickname